TSG may refer to:

Organisations
 Sabre Holdings (former NYSE ticker symbol)
 The Sage Group, a worldwide software company
 Technology Services Group, a UK-based IT company
 Technology Solutions Group, former name of HP Enterprise Business, a part of Hewlett-Packard
 Technology Solutions Group LLC, a water treatment services company
 Tennessee State Guard, the state defense force of Tennessee
 Territorial Support Group, a special response unit of London's Metropolitan Police Service
 Texas State Guard, the state defense force of Texas
 Tokushu Sakusen Gun, a Japanese special operations unit
 TheSpeedGamers, a charity group that plays speed runs of games to raise money for charity organizations 
 TSG Entertainment, a film financing entity
 TSG Consumer Partners, a private equity firm formerly known as The Shansby Group
 TSG Group aka The SCO Group, a software company
 TSG 1899 Hoffenheim, a German association football club

Science and technology
 Triggered spark gap, a high-voltage electronic switch
 Tumor suppressor gene, a gene that protects a cell from leading to cancer

Other uses
 Tai Seng MRT station, MRT station abbreviation
 The Smoking Gun, a website
 Traditional Speciality Guaranteed, a quality scheme for traditional food specialities in the European Union and the United Kingdom.

See also
 Texas State Guard (TXSG)